WRHV (88.7 FM) is a classical music-formatted radio station licensed to Poughkeepsie, New York and serving the Mid-Hudson Valley of New York state. The station is owned by WMHT Educational Telecommunications and is a satellite of Schenectady's WMHT-FM. WRHV transmits from the main Illinois Mountain tower in the town of Lloyd, New York.

WRHV, which signed on in November 1989 as WMHX-FM (sharing the calls of WMHT's secondary television station for the first year of its existence), is involved in one of the few remaining timeshare arrangements on radio in the United States. The 88.7 frequency is shared between WRHV and SUNY New Paltz-owned WFNP. Currently, WRHV is on the air at the following times from September 1 to December 1, and February 1 to May 1:

 Weekdays: 5:00 a.m-7:00 p.m.
 Saturdays: 5:00 a.m.-9:00 p.m.
 Sundays: 5:00 a.m.-10:00 p.m.

When SUNY New Paltz is either not in session, in exams, or in start-of-semester preparation, WRHV is heard around the clock. Nevertheless, the timeshare arrangement has had its critics on both sides and as a result WFNP-FM has proposed a move to 98.9 MHz where its programming would be heard full-time with WRHV becoming the sole occupant of the 88.7 MHz frequency.

See also

List of NPR stations
List of radio stations in New York

External links

Classical music radio stations in the United States
RHV
NPR member stations